KSL may refer to:

Companies and organizations
 KSL (radio), KSL-AM and KSL-FM, stations in Salt Lake City, Utah
 KSL-TV, a television station in Salt Lake City, Utah
 KSL.com, a Utah-based news website
 Key Sounds Label, a Japanese record label
 Knowledge Systems Laboratory, AI lab at Stanford
 Korea StarCraft League, a tournament

Locations and transportation
 Kate Sharpley Library, a library of anarchist publications 
 Kearsley railway station, England, station code
 KSL City, a shopping mall, Johor, Malaysia

Other
 Kenyan Sign Language
 Korean Sign Language
 Kia Super League, English cricket league (2016-2019)
 KSL cells, early form of hematopoietic stem cells